Pamela Renshaw (born 3 March 1951) is a British sprint canoer who competed in the early 1970s. She was eliminated from the semi finals of the K-2 500 m event at the 1972 Summer Olympics in Munich.

References
Sports-reference.com profile

1951 births
Canoeists at the 1972 Summer Olympics
Living people
Olympic canoeists of Great Britain
British female canoeists